Veľké Uherce is a village and municipality in Partizánske District in the Trenčín Region of western Slovakia.

History
In historical records the village was first mentioned in 1274 where it was mentioned as one of the first three townships in Austria-Hungary.

In 1869 Michael Thonet created a factory for bentwood furniture.

In the village, there is an originally renaissance castle from the start of the 17th century, rebuilt into a baroque style in the 18th century, and at the end of the 19th century, completely rebuilt into a romantic neogothic style. Today, the castle is owned by a descendant of the Thonet family.

During the SNU, there was a base of operations of the rebellion units defending Baťovany (Partizánkse today)

Geography
The municipality lies at an altitude of 230 meters and covers an area of 27.788 km2. It has a population of about 1,983 people.

References

External links

 

Villages and municipalities in Partizánske District